Lake Mendocino is a large reservoir in Mendocino County, California, northeast of Ukiah. The lake and dam provide flood control, water conservation, hydroelectric power, and recreation. The dam also includes a fallout shelter built during the Cold War era to protect against the radiation from nuclear attacks from the Soviet Union.

Recreation
Lake Mendocino is administered by the U.S. Army Corps of Engineers and offers disc golf, boating, water skiing, fishing, camping, and hiking.

There are 300+ campsites plus a small number of boat-in only sites. Three groups of campsites are named in the Pomo language of the local native people.

There are two boat ramps, at the north and south ends of the lake, and use for watersports is permitted. The lake also has numerous day use and picnic areas. Several hiking trails traverse the length of the lake.

The California Office of Environmental Health Hazard Assessment (OEHHA) has developed a safe eating advisory for Lake Mendocino based on levels of mercury found in fish caught from this water body.

Coyote Dam
It was built as a flood control project by the U.S. Army Corps of Engineers. Completed in 1959, it sits across the East Fork Russian River, which is the primary source of inflow to the lake. The dam offers public access by foot. The purpose of the dam was to prevent flooding in the Ukiah valley, and provide a  water supply for Sonoma county. During the Cold War it served as a fallout shelter in the case of a nuclear attack, which remains today at the dam with a radioactive symbol. There is also an hydroelectric dam controlled by the army corps of engineers including flood supply, which provides energy for the surrounding cities.

Coyote Valley
Beneath the surface of the lake lies the old Coyote Valley. With the construction of the dam, the Army Corps had to relocate the residents of the valley, along with a short portion of State Route 20 which was subsequently inundated.

See also
Lake Sonoma
List of dams and reservoirs in California
List of lakes in California

References

External links

Lake Mendocino Fishing

Lake Mendocino Water Supply Levels

Mendocino
Mendocino
Mendocino